Capital Bank may refer to:

 Capital Bank, part of Park Sterling Corp.
 Capital Bank (Botswana)
 Capital Bank (Jordan)
 Capital Bank (Haiti)
 Capital Bank plc (UK)
 Capital Bank (Ghana)
 ABC Capital Bank Uganda Limited, Uganda
 Capital Bank Financial, previously North American Financial Holdings
 Capital Bank Plaza, their headquarters
 Capital Bank and Trust, a division of Capital Group Companies
 Capital Bank Tower, Michigan USA
 Cavmont Bank, Zambia
 Imperial Capital Bank, now known as City National Bank
 GE Capital Bank, financial services unit of General Electric
 Pacific Capital Bancorp, California
 Renaissance Capital Bank, Ukraine